Alexander Drive is a major north–south arterial road in the northern suburbs of Perth, Western Australia, connecting Perth's central business district (CBD) with Edith Cowan University's Mount Lawley campus and the Malaga industrial area, as well as newer development suburbs to Perth's north. It is used by Transperth bus routes, including the 360, 361 and 362. Alexander Drive was named after Mr S.B. Alexander, a former Wanneroo Road Board member. Alexander Drive runs through the following local government areas City of Wanneroo, City of Swan, City of Bayswater and City of Stirling.

It is known as Road No. 7354 in plans and maps.

Route description

Fitzgerald Street 
State Route 56 starts in Northbridge, adjacent to Perth's CBD, as Fitzgerald Street, travelling northwards through West Perth and North Perth before becoming Alexander Drive at the intersection of Walcott Street.

Alexander Drive 
Alexander Drive officially commences at the traffic light intersection of Walcott Street in Menora in the City of Stirling, with Alexander Drive travelling entirely through the suburb for  before reaching Bradford Street. It briefly borders Mount Lawley and the suburb's Edith Cowan University campus for  before reaching Central Avenue, and changing borders to the east with Inglewood. The border to the west changes to Yokine only  later. About  later the road is within the suburb of Dianella, with the Woodrow Avenue intersection not any further down.

From Woodrow Avenue, Alexander Drive intersects Grand Promenade  later, and then Morley Drive at a hamburger roundabout  down the road. This roundabout also features left-in/left-out junctions with the northwestern and southeastern sections of a residential distributor road, The Strand. The road travels through Dianella for  before reaching Reid Highway at a diamond interchange. Between there and Widgee Road/Hellenic Drive, Alexander Drive briefly borders Noranda and the City of Bayswater to the east.

After the Reid Highway interchange Alexander Drive now forms the border of the City of Stirling and Mirrabooka to the west, and the City of Swan and Malaga to the east. It reaches Beach Road , after which the border to the west changes to the City of Wanneroo and Koondoola.  north of there, the road intersects with Illawarra Crescent South and the border to the east becomes Ballajura. It then reaches Marangaroo Drive  later, after which the border to the west changes to Alexander Heights. It intersects with Illawarra Crescent North , and then Hepburn Avenue .

After Hepburn Avenue, the road now borders Landsdale to the west and Cullacabardee to the east. To the west is mostly residential areas and some bushland and farming area soon to be converted into residential development, while to the east is exclusively bushland and rural area. Alexander Drive travels along these suburbs for  before reaching Gnangara Road. This intersection marks the northern terminus of State Route 56, but not Alexander Drive, which ends at a cul-de-sac north of the intersection.

History
In May 1932, the Perth Road Board (now City of Stirling) decided to rename Fitzgerald Street, north of Walcott Street, to Alexander Drive after Mr S.B. Alexander, who was a member of the Wanneroo Road Board (now City of Wanneroo). The name change was official made by the state government's Department of Lands and Surveys in September 1932. In 1939, improvement works were proposed for Alexander Drive and other roads in the area.

The north-south portion from Marangaroo Drive to Widgee Road was historically called Uganda Road and was barely more than a track, but was renamed when the dual carriageway was built in the late 1970s. The name change was made official in March 1979. The road was duplicated from Beach Road to the location of what is now the present-day Hepburn Avenue during the early 1990s, also during the time Reid Highway linked Alexander Drive to Malaga Drive; this was subsequently extended west from there.

In 2006, the original single carriageway northbound from Hepburn Ave was upgraded to a dual carriageway to Gnangara Road, where State Route 56 ends.

Traffic lights were installed at the intersection with Gnangara Road in 2007. In 2011, the original traffic light intersection with Reid Highway was upgraded to a diamond interchange. Reid Highway is now uninterrupted over traffic light junctions at Alexander Drive.

The MAX light rail system, which would run along Alexander Drive and Fitzgerald Street, was announced in 2012. The plans were modified to bus rapid transit in 2015, before being cancelled in 2016.

Major intersections

  Walcott Street (State Route 75) – North Perth and Menora
 Central Avenue, Mount Lawley – to Edith Cowan University
  Grand Promenade (State Route 55) – Dianella
  Morley Drive (State Route 76) – Dianella
  Reid Highway (State Route 3) - Mirrabooka, Noranda and Malaga
 Beach Road - Mirrabooka, Ballajura and Malaga
  Marangaroo Drive (State Route 81) – Ballajura and Alexander Heights
 Hepburn Avenue – Ballajura, Alexander Heights and Landsdale
  Gnangara Road (State Route 84) – Wangara and Gnangara, to Ellenbrook

See also

References

Roads in Perth, Western Australia
Articles containing video clips